Ashwin or Aswin is an Indian given name and surname. It is related to the name of the Ashvins, the divine twins of Vedic mythology, as well as to the name of the Hindu lunar month Ashvin. 

People with the surname include:

Bernard Ashwin (1896–1975), New Zealand public servant and economist
Chris Ashwin (born 1987), English rugby union player
Murugan Ashwin (born 1990), Indian cricketer
 Ravichandran Ashwin (born 1986), Indian cricketer 
Sumanth Ashwin, Indian Tollywood actor